Anapisa melaleuca is a moth of the family Erebidae. It was described by William Jacob Holland in 1898. It is found in Cameroon, the Republic of the Congo, the Democratic Republic of the Congo, Gabon, Kenya and Uganda.

References

Moths described in 1898
Syntomini
Erebid moths of Africa
Insects of Uganda
Insects of the Republic of the Congo
Insects of Gabon